Miracle Mile Shops (formerly Desert Passage) is a 475,000 square foot (44,129 m²),  long, enclosed shopping mall on the Las Vegas Strip in Las Vegas, Nevada. It is home to more than 170 stores, 15 restaurants and live entertainment venues.

Synonymous with retail districts throughout the country, the name connotes a shopping environment and also alludes to the "Miracle Mile" district, as the casino renovates its image to a Los Angeles themed resort.

History

The $300 million mall, located in the center of the Las Vegas Strip, opened on August 17, 2000 as Desert Passage mall inside the reconstructed Aladdin hotel. It was built and operated by Trizec Properties and originally featured a Moroccan theme. The shopping complex featured an hourly indoor thunderstorm.

The mall was sold in 2003 to Boulevard Invest LLC, owned by Investcorp, RFR Holding LLC and Tristar Capital.

To match the conversion of the Aladdin to a Planet Hollywood Las Vegas, the Desert Passage was renovated and adopted a new Los Angeles theme. It was renamed Miracle Mile Shops in 2007.

In 2016, Boulevard Invest sold the mall for about $1.1 billion to a partnership of Miller Capital Advisory and CalPERS.

Entertainment
The mall is home to live entertainment inside the Saxe Theater and V Theater. A dozen shows daily include V - The Ultimate Variety Show, Nathan Burton Magic Show, NEWSical The Musical and A Musical About Star Wars.  

At the top of each hour daily, and every half hour Friday, Saturday, and Sunday, an indoor "rainstorm" show features artificial lightning, fog, and rain.

References

External links
 
 Miracle Mile Shops unveiled
 

2000 establishments in Nevada
Buildings and structures in Paradise, Nevada
Las Vegas Strip
Shopping malls established in 2000
Shopping malls in the Las Vegas Valley